Bardabad Garrison is a garrison and village in Koregah-e Gharbi Rural District, in the Central District of Khorramabad County, Lorestan Province, Iran. At the 2006 census, its population was 3,289, in 812 families.

References 

Towns and villages in Khorramabad County
Military installations of Iran